= Chelyabinsky =

Chelyabinsky (masculine), Chelyabinskaya (feminine), or Chelyabinskoye (neuter) may refer to:

- Chelyabinsk Oblast (Chelyabinskaya oblast), a federal subject of Russia
- Chelyabinsky Urban Okrug, a municipal formation, which the city of Chelyabinsk, Chelyabinsk Oblast, Russia, is incorporated as
